Nationell Idag (National Today) was an independent Swedish periodical founded in 2002 by the now defunct extreme right-wing political party National Democrats. As of 2014, the paper described its platform as based on the ideology of the Sweden Democrat party. It was 16 pages long and was released once a week, reaching around 1800 readers. At the end of 2012 the paper lost state subsidy which was granted to it in 2010. The editor as of 2014 was Patrik Ehn.

The content of the periodical was based on political nationalism, criticism of multiculturalism and the Swedish immigration policy, and features about nationalist organisations in other countries.

References

External links
  Nationell Idag

2002 establishments in Sweden
2014 disestablishments in Sweden
Defunct newspapers published in Sweden
Newspapers established in 2002
Newspapers published in Stockholm
Publications disestablished in 2014
Swedish-language newspapers
Weekly newspapers published in Sweden